Larry Levi Willingham (born December 22, 1948) is a retired professional American football player.  He played in the National Football League for the St. Louis Cardinals (1971–1972) and in the World Football League for both the Birmingham Americans (1974) and Birmingham Vulcans (1975).  He was an All-American defensive back for Auburn University in 1970 and inducted into the Alabama Sports Hall of Fame in 2003.

Early years
Willingham attended L. Frazier Banks High School in Birmingham, Alabama, where he was named to the Division 4A All-State Second-team as an end in 1966.  He spent his college years at Auburn University where he played defensive back.  Willingham was named second-team All-Southeastern Conference (SEC) in 1969 and first-team All-SEC in 1970. He was also selected to eight All-America teams in 1970.  Willingham would later be named a member of Auburn's "Team of the Decade" for the 1970s and inducted into the Alabama Sports Hall of Fame in 2003.

Professional career
Willingham began his injury-shortened professional career with the NFL's St. Louis Cardinals in 1971 as a defensive back. Seeing limited playing time, he was being forced to retire for medical reasons following the 1972 season.  He came out of retirement in 1974 to play for the Birmingham Americans of the upstart World Football League.  He helped the team win the World Bowl in December 1974.  After the Americans folded, Willingham signed with the successor Birmingham Americans for the 1975 season. After retiring from the St. Louis Cardinals in 1975, Larry entered the Real Estate business from 1976-1981 in Birmingham, AL. Then went to work at Rust Engineering as a Project Purchasing Agent until 1990. From there he went on to industrial chemical pipping sales at Industrial Products in Birmingham covering Alabama and Tennessee until 2003. Larry decided to move to Gulf Shores, AL. and reentered his initial career in Real Estate Sales.

References

Living people
1948 births
People from Cullman, Alabama
Players of American football from Alabama
All-American college football players
Auburn Tigers football players
St. Louis Cardinals (football) players
Birmingham Americans players
Birmingham Vulcans players